Shirley Anne Stobs (born May 20, 1942) is an American former competition swimmer, Olympic champion, and former world record-holder.  She competed at the 1960 Olympic Games in Rome, where she received a gold medal as a member of the winning U.S. team in the women's 4×100-meter freestyle relay, together with her teammates Joan Spillane, Carolyn Wood and Chris von Saltza.  She and her relay teammates set a new world record of 4:08.9 in the event final.

See also
 List of Olympic medalists in swimming (women)
 World record progression 4 × 100 metres freestyle relay

References

External links
 

1942 births
Living people
American female freestyle swimmers
World record setters in swimming
Olympic gold medalists for the United States in swimming
Sportspeople from Miami
Swimmers at the 1959 Pan American Games
Swimmers at the 1960 Summer Olympics
Medalists at the 1960 Summer Olympics
Pan American Games gold medalists for the United States
Pan American Games medalists in swimming
Medalists at the 1959 Pan American Games
21st-century American women